Saint Paul's Rectory is a historic church rectory at 130 Aspinwall Avenue in Brookline, Massachusetts.  The -story Jacobethan stone house was built in 1886 to a design by Peabody and Stearns.  It was designed to complement the Gothic Revival style of Saint Paul's Episcopal Church, for whose rector it was built.  The exterior is finished in Brighton puddingstone and Nova Scotia freestone; its gable ends have elbows on the parapet walls, and the upper-level windows have diamond panes.

The house was listed on the National Register of Historic Places in 1985.

See also
National Register of Historic Places listings in Brookline, Massachusetts

References

Religious buildings and structures completed in 1886
Houses in Brookline, Massachusetts
National Register of Historic Places in Brookline, Massachusetts
Houses on the National Register of Historic Places in Norfolk County, Massachusetts